Betty Hilton (born Elizabeth Evelyn Clements, 12 February 1920 – 3 July 2017) was a British tennis player of the post-World War II era. She reached the women's doubles final at the 1949 French Open alongside Joy Gannon. Clements also reached the quarterfinals in singles at the 1946 French Open and the quarterfinals at the 1949 and 1950 Wimbledon Championships.

Career 

Clements reached her first singles quarterfinal and doubles semifinal at the 1946 French Championships. In 1947 she reached her first Wimbledon doubles semifinal with partner Jean Bostock falling to Doris Hart and Pat Todd who went on to win the championships. The next year Clements partnered Kay Menzies and reached the third round. Clements partnered Joy Gannon in 1949 at Wimbledon and reached the semifinals for the second time in her career, they lost to Louise Brough and Margarent du Pont.

At the 1948 British Hard Court Championships Clements won the women's singles title defeating Pamela Bocquet 6–1, 6–4 in the final.

At the 1949 Scandinavian Indoor Championships Clements won the women's doubles title with Jean Quertier.

In 1949 and 1950 Clements reached consecutive singles quarterfinals at Wimbledon, in 1949 falling to Margaret du Pont and in 1950 falling to Pat Todd.

Personal life 

Clements married Raymond Hilton on 2 September 1942, he died during WWII. Clements played under the name Hilton until her second marriage to Andrew James Christopher Harrison on 19 June 1950 and Clements briefly played under the name Harrison until she retired later that year.

Career statistics

Grand Slam performance timelines

Singles

Doubles 

R = tournament restricted to French nationals and held under German occupation.

1In 1946 and 1947, the French Championships were held after Wimbledon.

Grand Slam finals

Doubles (1 runner-up)

References 

British female tennis players
1920 births
2017 deaths